Kylie Shadbolt (born 8 November 1972) is an Australian artistic gymnast.

Shadbolt competed at the 1992 Summer Olympics in Barcelona in the individual and team all-around events. She also competed at the 1990 Commonwealth Games where she won a silver medal in the team event and bronze medals in the individual, beam and floor events.

References

1972 births
Living people
Olympic gymnasts of Australia
Gymnasts at the 1992 Summer Olympics
Gymnasts at the 1990 Commonwealth Games
Australian female artistic gymnasts
Commonwealth Games silver medallists for Australia
Commonwealth Games bronze medallists for Australia
Commonwealth Games medallists in gymnastics
20th-century Australian women
Medallists at the 1990 Commonwealth Games